Hemerorhinus is a genus of eels in the snake eel family Ophichthidae. It contains the following species:

 Hemerorhinus heyningi (M. C. W. Weber, 1913)
 Hemerorhinus opici Blache & Bauchot, 1972

References

Ophichthidae